Woodbourne station is a train station located on Woodbourne Road in Middletown Township, Pennsylvania along the SEPTA West Trenton Line which terminates at West Trenton station in Ewing, New Jersey, and also on the CSX Trenton Subdivision which has a freight yard not far by the station.  In FY 2013, Woodbourne station had a weekday average of 702 boardings and 661 alightings.

Reconstruction project
Woodbourne station as it is known today is the result of two year, two phase, $2,069,344 project undertaken in 2000 by SEPTA known as the "Woodbourne Reconstruction and Parking Expansion Project".

Phase I
Phase I of this project provided for improvements to SEPTA's Woodbourne station parking lot on the West Trenton Regional Rail Line.
The scope of work included the paving of the existing 79-space gravel lot and the expansion of this lot to accommodate an additional 58 parking spaces. Also included in the first phase was the purchase of the newly constructed 380-space parking facility built to SEPTA's specifications. The builder and property owner, McGrath Homes, was willing to enter into the transaction with SEPTA to complement their residential construction adjacent to the site.  Phase I was completed in October 2000.

Phase II
Phase II of this project, completed in November 2002, consisted of the construction of new station facilities on the other side of Woodbourne Road, adjacent to the new parking lot. The new low level platform accommodates a six-car train and a large canopy/shelter is located near its center. New gooseneck style lighting fixtures were installed throughout the station area. 
Accessibility features include new tactile edging, a mini-high level platform, signage, and an AVPA system. Due to the configuration of this three-track territory (2 passenger tracks and one freight track), cross track boarding platforms were installed in order to reach the center (outbound) passenger track. The location of the old station has since become a popular location for local railfans to watch and film trains from.

Station layout
Woodbourne consists of a single low-level side platform adjacent to the inbound track. Access to the outbound track is via concrete crossovers of the inbound track.

References

External links

SEPTA - Woodbourne Station
 Station from Woodbourne Road from Google Maps Street View

SEPTA Regional Rail stations
Former Reading Company stations
Railway stations in Bucks County, Pennsylvania